Dominika Polakowska (born December 3, 1982 in Łódź, Poland) is a Polish former ice dancer. She competed with Marcin Trębacki and Michał Tomaszewski. She was coached by Dorota Pela-Matusiak.

Competitive highlights
(with Trębacki)

 J = Junior level

External links
 

1982 births
Polish female ice dancers
Living people
Sportspeople from Łódź